Mob Style (or Mobstyle) was an American hip hop group from Harlem, New York, consisting of rappers A.Z. (not to be confused with later Brooklyn rapper AZ), Pretty Tone Capone, Gangster Lou and Whip Wop.

The group were among the first hip hop artists to release full-length albums independently with 1990's The Good, the Bad, the Ugly and 1992's Game of Death, at a time when major labels were the most popular way to release music.

Mob Style was one of the first New York gangsta rap groups. In the 1980s, group leader Azie "A.Z." Faison was the largest individual drug dealer in New York City.

The group reunited in 2003 to release their final album, Blood on My Money.

Discography 
 The Good, the Bad, the Ugly (1990)
 Game of Death (1992)
 Blood on My Money (2003)

References 

Rappers from Manhattan
Gangsta rap groups
Musical groups established in 1990
1990 establishments in New York City